Akhmet Magametovich Barakhoyev (born 10 September 1984) is a former Russian professional football player.

Club career
In 2012, he played for the Moldovan club FC Zimbru Chișinău.

External links
 

1984 births
Living people
People from Ingushetia
Russian footballers
Association football midfielders
Russian expatriate footballers
Expatriate footballers in Moldova
Moldovan Super Liga players
FC Dynamo Stavropol players
FC Zimbru Chișinău players
FC Dacia Chișinău players
FC Angusht Nazran players